Vanishing Borders is a 2014 American documentary film written, directed, and produced by Alexandra Hidalgo. The film was screened at the All Lights India International Film Festival, Glendale International Film Festival and Commffest, Toronto.

Plot 
The film tells the stories of four immigrant women — Teboho Moja, Melainie Rogers, Daphnie Sicre and Yatna Vakharia — living in New York City and improving their communities with their work and activism to celebrate the ways in which immigration can transform not only those who immigrate but the places to which they move.

Teboho Moja is a South African professor of higher education, who worked in the anti-apartheid movement.

Melainie Rogers is an Australian nutritionist whose private practice hires primarily women.

Daphnie Sicre is a Latina raised in Spain, who is an activist and a Ph.D. candidate in educational theater.

Yatna Vakharia is an Indian mother of two and school volunteer, who began attending college when her children became teenagers.

Awards  
 Won - Kudos Endeavor Award for Human Spirit Feature at the Docs Without Borders Film Festival, 2016
 Won - International Award of Excellence at the International Film Festival For Environment, Health and Culture, 2016

References

External links 
 
 

2014 films
2014 documentary films
American documentary films
2010s English-language films
2010s American films